High and Mighty may refer to:

In music:
 High and Mighty (album), an album by Uriah Heep
 High & Mighty, an album by Gov't Mule
 High and Mighty (band), an American rap duo

In other uses:
 High and Mighty (book), a nonfiction book about SUVs by Keith Bradsher
 High and Mighty (shop), a UK big-and-tall menswear retail outlet

See also
 High and Mighty Color, a Japanese J-rock band
 The High and the Mighty (disambiguation)